Billy Mills (born 1954) is an Irish experimental poet.  He was born in Dublin, and  lived in Barcelona from 1986 to 1989, after which he taught English in Eastbourne.  He lives in Limerick.

Mills is the founder and co-editor (with poet Catherine Walsh) of the hardPressed poetry imprint and the Journal. The goal of hardPressed poetry is to publish and distribute mainly Irish poetry "that you won't often find in your local bookshop".

He is a regular contributor of articles on The Guardian newspaper's book blog.

Works
Genesis and Home (hardPressed poetry, 1985)
On First Looking into Lorine Niedecker (hardPressed poetry, 1986)
A Small Love Song (Red Wheelbarrow Press, 1986 - folded broadsheet)
Triple Helix (hardPressed poetry, 1987)
Letters from Barcelona (Dedalus, 1990)
Properties Of Stone (Writers Forum, London, 1996)
5 Easy Pieces (Shearsman, Plymouth, 1997)
Horace: 5 Traductions (Form Books, London, 1997)
Tiny Pieces (Wild Honey, Dublin, 1998)
A Small Book of Songs (Wild Honey, 1999)
What is a Mountain? (hardPressed poetry, 2000)
Lares/Manes: Collected Poems (Shearsman, 2009)
Imaginary Gardens (hardPressed poetry, 2012)
The City Itself (Hesterglock Press, 2017)

References

External links
 Billy Mills' blog

Living people
1954 births
Irish poets